Jenny Burton (born November 18, 1957, New York) is an American R&B singer who had several hits on the US Billboard dance chart.

Career
She was lead singer of the dance music band C-Bank's 1983 Top 5 Hot Dance Music/Club Play single "One More Shot", notable for record producer John Robie's use of a "non-linear" approach to its production.

In 1983 Burton went solo, releasing the album In Black and White also produced by Robie. This album featured the Top 20 single "Remember What You Like" and the club favorites "Players" and "Rock Steady," all released on Atlantic Records. She had her biggest success in 1984 with the release of her second self-titled album, featuring the #1 dance hit and #19 R&B single "Bad Habits". The track reached #24 in the Netherlands Single Top 100 and #68 in the UK Singles Chart in March 1985. Also in 1984 Burton sang two songs, "Strangers in a Strange World" and "It's Alright By Me", used on the soundtrack to the film Beat Street.

In the 1990s, having regrouped as an inspirational artist, Burton had a successful run at the New York venue Don't Tell Mama, with her band and group the Jenny Burton Experience. She was married to Broadway songwriter Peter Link.

Jenny Burton now focuses on gospel and inspirational music. Her last albums were released on Watchfire Records.

Discography

Albums
1983: In Black and White
1985: Jenny Burton
1986: Souvenirs
2005: The Jenny Burton Experience
2007: I Think on These Things
2008: In Black and White (CD reissue)
2014: Jenny Burton (CD reissue including bonus tracks)
2014: The Best of Jenny Burton

Singles

See also
List of Number 1 Dance Hits (United States)
List of artists who reached number one on the US Dance chart

References

External links
 Jenny Burton at Discogs.
 Jenny Burton on AllMusic.

1957 births
Living people
American women singers
American dance musicians
American disco musicians
American rhythm and blues singers
21st-century American women